Junior Choice is a BBC Radio programme originally broadcast from 1967 until 1982 with Christmas specials from 2007 until 2015 and again since 2017. Originally  broadcast on the BBC Light Programme on Saturday mornings from 9.10 to 9.55 (later, 9.00–10.00). and later BBC Radio 1, and BBC Radio 2. Its precursor from 1952 was entitled Children's Choice, echoing the weekday Housewives' Choice, then from 1954, Children's Favourites.

The programme played requests from children of all ages. For the first 11 years of its run, the programme was introduced by Derek McCulloch, known as Uncle Mac. McCulloch's grandfatherly tone was quintessentially 'old-school' BBC. His opening words "Hello children, everywhere!", his catch-phrase was a modification of his much earlier closing words "Goodnight children, everywhere" on Children's Hour.

Children wrote in with requests often just to get their names mentioned on the radio. McCulloch ensured that all types of music were played whatever the majority had requested: not just children's pieces but a wide range of music from pop to hymns to the light classics. The signature tune until the mid-1960s was Puffin' Billy by Edward White played by the Melodi Light Orchestra.

Later versions
McCulloch made his last broadcast in 1965 and several other presenters were tried including Leslie Crowther. After BBC Radio 1 and BBC Radio 2 were launched, the show was renamed Junior Choice  and simultaneously broadcast on both stations and Puffin' Billy was replaced by an instrumental version of the Seekers' hit Morningtown Ride played by Stan Butcher, from his 1966 album a His Birds and Brass, which remained the show's theme until Stewart's last show, the 2015 Christmas Day special. It was then revived on the 2020 and 2021 Christmas Specials with Anneka Rice.

In February 1968, Ed 'Stewpot' Stewart took over from Crowther and was the host for eleven years, attracting more than 17 million listeners. The style became less cosy and less reverent. As tastes changed, new favourites were added, pop records, as opposed to records specifically for children, were requested more frequently as the 1970s progressed. t Among the records frequently played were "A Windmill in Old Amsterdam" by Ronnie Hilton, "Hello Muddah, Hello Fadduh" by Allan Sherman and "My Brother" by Terry Scott. The show was peppered with catch-phrase jingles such as "'Ello Darlin'", recorded by an unknown patient at a hospital in Billericay and "Happy Birthday to You" sung by an eight-year-old boy from a football club in Crosskeys, on the team coach after the match. The Ello Darlin jingle was featured until Stewart's last show in 2015, although Rice did revive it on the 2020 and 2021 Christmas editions.

In 1980, Stewart was replaced by Tony Blackburn but by this time the programme was seen as somewhat old-fashioned. t The title Junior Choice was dropped in the early months of 1982, and the programme was renamed Tony Blackburn's Saturday/Sunday Show whilst retaining the children's requests aspect of Junior Choice. In September 1984, Peter Powell took over the weekend breakfast show, and children's requests did not form part of the new programme, thereby removing the link with the "Uncle Mac" era.

In 2007 Stewart returned as host for a one-off programme during Radio 2's 40th Birthday celebrations in September and then what has become a regular Christmas special, starting on Christmas Eve that year, and then every Christmas Day from 2008 onwards (except 2016). The last of these featuring Stewart as host was in 2015, as he died suddenly just two weeks later, aged 74, on 9 January 2016.

After Stewart's death and a hiatus in 2016, the show returned on Christmas Day 2017, with Anneka Rice as its new host, who since then has presented more Christmas Day editions. For the 2018 and 2019 editions, Rice invited young listeners, named Junior Choosers, to call in to the show to play a game with her and pick a song. This was then dropped for the 2020 and 2021 editions, which reverted more to the feel of the Stewart era, and had some fellow Radio 2 presenters choosing a song to be played on the show.

Presenters:
Derek McCulloch (1954–1965)
Leslie Crowther (1965–1968)
Ed Stewart (1968–1979, 2007 birthday special, Christmas editions, 2007–2015)
Tony Blackburn (1980–82, when Junior Choice name was dropped)
Anneka Rice (Christmas editions, 2017–present)

References

External links
 "Puffin' Billy" theme music
 'Stewpot's' Junior Choice at h2g2.com, with a list of records played

BBC Light Programme programmes
BBC Radio 2 programmes
BBC Radio 1 programmes
British music radio programmes